Schistura kloetzliae is a species of cyprinid fish in the family stone loach. It has been recorded from the Mengla drainage in Yunnan and its tributary Nam Youan in Luang Namtha province in Laos. It occurs in medium fast currents in streams with gravel or stony bottoms. The specific name honours Antoinette Kottelat-Kloetzli, for her help and support of Maurice Kottelat during his work in Laos, among other things.

Schistura kloetzliae can reach  in standard length.

References

K
Cyprinid fish of Asia
Fish of the Mekong Basin
Fish of Laos
Freshwater fish of China
Taxa named by Maurice Kottelat
Fish described in 2000